José Ruiz de Rivera (September 18, 1904 March 12, 1985) was an American abstract sculptor.

Life and career
José Ruiz de Rivera was born in Baton Rouge, Louisiana and grew up in New Orleans. He dropped out of high school, but finished at a boarding school. He worked on a plantation fixing farm machinery. In 1924, he moved to Chicago. He studied drawing with muralist John W. Norton and worked for the Federal Arts Project of the Works Progress Administration.

In 1932, he moved to Manhattan. He also worked as a model maker for Sikorsky Aircraft. He served in the United States Army Air Corps in World War II, and at the Training Aids Development Center.

In 1946, he had his first one-man show at the Mortimer Levitt Gallery, New York City.

In 1947–52, de Rivera's Black, yellow, red (1942) was exhibited in the 25-venue Painting toward architecture exhibition organized by the Miller Company Collection of Abstract Art. The artwork received a lot of media attention during the exhibition and was the artwork spotlighted (via the one photo accompanying the article) in the New York Times article about the first venue of the exhibition at the Wadsworth Atheneum in Hartford, CT. A photo of the artwork was also used to accompany an article about the exhibition in Newsweek. Black, yellow, red was also featured in Henry-Russell Hitchcock's accompanying book Painting toward architecture (1948), with foreword by Alfred Barr of the Museum of Modern Art, New York. The artwork was also the basis for the cover of a Miller Company heater design catalogue, thematically called "A spiralating heat wave".

In 2002–03, the Valerie Carberry Gallery in Chicago exhibited Jose de Rivera: Abstract Sculpture, Painting and Works on Paper.

On March 12, 1984, at the age of 80, de Rivera died at Lenox Hill Hospital, New York City, five weeks after suffering a stroke.

Works
Black, Yellow, Red, (1942). National Gallery of Art, 1977.75.8
American Pavilion at the Expo 58 
Construction #46, Chazen Museum of Art
Form, 1964 World's Fair
Infinity, 1967, National Museum of American History
Construction #105, 1968, Rochester Institute of Technology
Construction #35, 1956, Hirshhorn Museum and Sculpture Garden, 66.1277
Construction #76, 1961, Hirshhorn, 66.1279
Construction #107, 1969, Hirshhorn, 72.91
Construction, Red and Black, 1954, Hirshhorn, 66.1278
Construction in Yellow, Black, Red and White, c. 1949–1952, Hirshhorn, 86.1412
Homage to the World of Minkowski, 1954–1955, Metropolitan Museum of Art, 55.204ab
Construction #158, 1974–1975, Metropolitan Museum of Art, 1985.432ab
A Wishing Star, 1956, Dallas Statler Hilton

Sources

References

External links

 
"Oral history interview with José de Rivera, February 24, 1968", Archives of American Art, Smithsonian Institution, Washington, DC.

1904 births
1985 deaths
Artists from Baton Rouge, Louisiana
United States Army Air Forces personnel of World War II
20th-century American sculptors
20th-century American male artists
American male sculptors
Federal Art Project artists